Jerdarrian Devontae Davison (born October 3, 2002) is an American professional basketball player for the Boston Celtics of the National Basketball Association (NBA), on a two-way contract with the Maine Celtics of the NBA G League. He played college basketball for the Alabama Crimson Tide. He was a consensus five-star recruit and one of the top point guards in the 2021 class.

High school career
Davison attended Calhoun High School in Letohatchee, Alabama. As a junior, Davison averaged 30.4 points, 12 rebounds and five assists per game, earning Alabama Mr. Basketball and Alabama Gatorade Player of the Year honors. He led his team to a Class 2A state title, converting a game-winning three-pointer as part of a 34-point, 10-rebound performance in the title game. As a senior, Davison averaged 32.4 points, 10.9 rebounds and 4.7 assists per game. He was selected as Alabama Mr. Basketball for a second consecutive season. Davison was named to the McDonald's All-American Game and Jordan Brand Classic rosters.

Recruiting
Davison was a consensus five-star recruit and one of the top point guards in the 2021 class. On October 3, 2020, he committed to playing college basketball for Alabama over offers from Auburn, LSU, Memphis, Michigan and Kansas. He became the first five-star recruit during the tenure of head coach Nate Oats. He was drawn to Alabama in part because he wanted to remain close to home.

College career
As a freshman, Davison averaged 8.5 points, 4.8 rebounds, and 4.3 assists per game. He was named to the SEC All-Freshman Team. On April 13, 2022, Davison declared for the 2022 NBA draft, forgoing his remaining college eligibility.

Professional career

Boston Celtics (2022–present)
Davison was selected with the 53rd overall pick by the Boston Celtics. On July 8, 2022, the Celtics signed him to a two-way contract. Under the terms of the deal he would split time between the Celtics and their NBA G League affiliate, the Maine Celtics. Davison made his NBA debut on November 11, 2022 in a 131-112 win over the Denver Nuggets.

Career statistics

College

|-
| style="text-align:left;"| 2021–22
| style="text-align:left;"| Alabama
| 33 || 5 || 25.8 || .463 || .301 || .728 || 4.8 || 4.3 || 1.0 || .4 || 8.5

References

External links

Alabama Crimson Tide bio

2002 births
Living people
Alabama Crimson Tide men's basketball players
American men's basketball players
Basketball players from Alabama
Boston Celtics draft picks
Boston Celtics players
Maine Celtics players
McDonald's High School All-Americans
People from Lowndes County, Alabama
Point guards